Voetbalvereniging Capelle is a Dutch football team, founded on 20 February 1930.

Its home venue is Sportpark 't Slot in Capelle aan den IJssel.

Since 2018, VV Capelle competes in the Hoofdklasse.

Associated people

Chief coach 
 Arie van der Zouwen (2005–2006)
 René Vermunt (2007–2011)
 Ronald Klinkenberg (2011–2013)
 Theo de Boon (2013–2014)
 Ton van Bremen (2014–2016)
 Winand van Loon (2016–2018)
 Ron Timmers (2018)
 Ton van Bremen (2018–2020)
 Gijs Zwaan (interim, 2020)
 Ralph Kalkman (since 2020)
 René van Eck  (since 1/1/2023)

Former players

References

External links
 Official website

 
Football clubs in the Netherlands
Football clubs in South Holland
Association football clubs established in 1930
1930 establishments in the Netherlands
Sport in Capelle aan den IJssel